Leon Bender (August 8, 1975 – May 30, 1998) was an American football defensive tackle, was selected in the second round of the 1998 NFL Draft (31st overall) by the Oakland Raiders. He played college football at Washington State under head coach Mike Price; in his senior season of 1997, the Cougars won the Pac-10 title and played in the Rose Bowl, WSU's first return to the game in 67 years. He graduated in 1993 from Santana High School in Santee, California, east of San Diego.

Death
Six weeks after the draft, Bender unexpectedly died at age 22 before gaining the opportunity to play an NFL game. He was found dead in the home of sports agent Terry Bolar in Marietta, Georgia, northwest of Atlanta. Bender was visiting Bolar, an associate of Eugene Parker, Bender's agent. He had signed a five-year, $3.45 million  contract a few weeks earlier, and was in Georgia to train for an upcoming Raiders' mini-camp.

The Cobb County medical examiner's office confirmed on June 10 that a seizure disorder was the cause of death. Bender had been previously diagnosed with epilepsy, known by Washington State and the Raiders, but not publicized; his Cougar teammates were not aware of it. He was buried in California at Singing Hills Memorial Park in El Cajon.

References

External links

1975 births
1998 deaths
People from Ontario, California
Players of American football from California
Sportspeople from San Bernardino County, California
American football defensive tackles
Washington State Cougars football players
Neurological disease deaths in Georgia (U.S. state)
Deaths from epilepsy